Robert "Bobby" Lea is an American track cyclist. At the 2008 Summer Olympics, he competed in the men's point race, which he did not finish, and the men's madison, where he finished in 16th place.  At the 2012 Summer Olympics, he competed in the men's omnium.

Doping case
After U.S. Track Nationals in 2015, Lea tested positive for noroxycodone, a metabolite of oxycodone found in Percocet which is a substance on the USADA banned list. Lea was given a 16-month suspension starting September 10, 2015. He petitioned the suspension to the Court of Arbitration for Sport and On February 26, 2016 his suspension was reduced to 6-months. Lea responded to his initial suspension by posting on his private website:
"On the night of August 7th, in a state of post-race exhaustion and having run out of my normal sleep aid, I made the poor choice to take my prescription Percocet hoping it would help me rest."

See also
List of Pennsylvania State University Olympians

References

External links

American male cyclists
1983 births
Living people
Olympic cyclists of the United States
Cyclists at the 2008 Summer Olympics
Cyclists at the 2012 Summer Olympics
Cyclists at the 2016 Summer Olympics
American track cyclists
People from Easton, Maryland
Doping cases in cycling
American sportspeople in doping cases